The African smoky mouse or smokey heimyscus (Heimyscus fumosus) is a species of rodent in the family Muridae. It is the only species in the genus Heimyscus.

It is native to Central Africa, where it occurs in Cameroon, Central African Republic, Republic of the Congo, Democratic Republic of the Congo, Equatorial Guinea, and Gabon. It is a habitat specialist, living only in primary lowland forest. It is threatened by deforestation.

Notes

References

Old World rats and mice
Rodents of Africa
Mammals described in 1965
Taxonomy articles created by Polbot
Taxa named by Henri Heim de Balsac